Marc van Belkum (born January 27, 1965 in Leiden) is a former water polo player from the Netherlands, who finished in ninth position with the Dutch team at the 1992 Summer Olympics in Barcelona.

References

External links
https://web.archive.org/web/20090210140008/http://www.sports-reference.com/olympics/athletes/va/marc-van-belkum-1.html

1965 births
Living people
Dutch male water polo players
Olympic water polo players of the Netherlands
Water polo players at the 1992 Summer Olympics
Sportspeople from Leiden
20th-century Dutch people